The 2023 ELF season is the third season of the European League of Football, a professional American football league based in Europe. Seventeen teams from nine different countries will participate and will compete for the title at the Championship Game in the Schauinsland-Reisen-Arena Duisburg, Germany on September 24, 2023.

Format 
The teams are divided into three conferences of 5 or 6 teams. Each team plays 12 games during the regular season. The winner of each conference, as well as the next best 3 teams, regardless of conference, qualify for the playoffs.

Teams 
11 of the 12 teams from the 2022 season are competing in 2023, and are joined by 6 new expansion teams: Fehérvár Enthroners, Helvetic Guards, Milano Seamen, Munich Ravens, Paris Musketeers and Prague Lions. The only team not returning for the new season is the Istanbul Rams.

Rosters  
Like last season, there is a limit of 4 non-European foreign players per roster, and two on the field at the same time. Players who are dual citizens of the U.S. and a EU-member country are not counted towards that limit in keeping with the Bosman ruling. There is also a limit of 6 European foreigners per roster, down from 8 the previous season. Brazilian players do not count towards the import quota.
For the 2023 season, the active rosters consist of 53 players, the gameday rosters of 46 players, while the practice squad was increased to 12 players.

Coaching changes

Regular season

Schedule 
The schedule for the 2023 season was released on January 27, 2023 without any specific times and venues. In Week 10, all teams are on bye due to the 2023 European Championship of American football.

Results

Standings 

In case ties inside and between the conferences have to be broken, the rules are:

 Number of wins
 Head-to-head matchup
 Points difference in head-to-head matchups
 Points scored at away games of head-to-head matchups
 Total points difference
 Total points scored
 Point scored at away games
 Coin toss performed by the Commissioner or a person (e.g., a prominent sportsmen) determined by the Commissioner

Notes

References

External links 

 Official website of the European League of Football

2023 in American football
2023 in European sport
European League of Football seasons
2023 ELF season